Struffoli also known as Honey Balls is a Neapolitan dish made of deep fried balls of sweet dough. The dough is used in many Italian sweet treats such as chiacchiere. For struffoli, the dough is formed in to balls about the size of marbles. Crunchy on the outside and light inside, struffoli are mixed with honey and other sweet ingredients and formed into mounds or rings. There are many different ways to flavour them, but the traditional way is to mix them in honey with diavulilli (nonpareils sprinkles), cinnamon, and bits of orange rind. Naming varies by region: in Calabria they are also known as scalilli, and in Abruzzo cicerchiata. They are often served at Christmas and are sometimes served warm.

History
A similar dish is described by Archestratus, a Greek poet from Gela in Sicily. It was called enkris — a dough-ball fried in olive oil, which he details in his Gastronomy; a work now lost, but partially preserved in the Deipnosophists of Athenaeus, which mentions enkris thirteen times, in various inflected forms.
The most complete description of it in the Deipnosophists is a passage that reads:

The name struffoli originates from the Greek word strongoulos, which means rounded.

Similar dishes
 Piñonate (Andalusia)
 Gulab jamun (South Asia)
 Croquembouche (France)
 Lokma (Mediterranean basin)
 Pignolata (Sicily)
 Teiglach (Jewish cookies)
 Çäkçäk (Tatar, Bashkir and Central Asian dish)

See also

 List of deep fried foods
 List of doughnut varieties

References

Italian desserts
Christmas food
Neapolitan cuisine
Italian doughnuts